New Man may refer to:

 "New Man" (All Things New song), 2013.
 "New Man" (Ed Sheeran song), 2017.
 New Man (Christian magazine), American Christian men's magazine.
 New Man (utopian concept).
 New Man (gender stereotype), archetype of male behaviour, typically narcissistic and/or pro-feminist, widely discussed in UK mass media in the late 1980s and 1990s.
 New Soviet man, imagined archetype of Communist ideologists.
 Hombre nuevo socialista, Che Guevara's idealised "New Man" concept.
 Novus homo, Latin term for a man who was first in his family to serve in the Roman Senate.
 "New Man", the pilot episode of the British sitcom PhoneShop.
 , French clothing retailer.

See also
 "A New Man", an episode of Buffy the Vampire Slayer.
 The New Man (disambiguation).
 Superman (disambiguation).
 Newman (disambiguation)